Ropar or Rupar was a Lok Sabha constituency in Punjab. It was dissolved in 2008.

Members of Parliament

^bypoll
2008 Onwards: Fatehgarh Sahib

See also
 Rupnagar (formerly known as Ropar)
 Fatehgarh Sahib Lok Sabha constituency
 List of Constituencies of the Lok Sabha

References

Former Lok Sabha constituencies of Punjab, India
2008 disestablishments in India
Constituencies disestablished in 2008
Former constituencies of the Lok Sabha